The men's 200 metres event at the 1994 World Junior Championships in Athletics was held in Lisbon, Portugal, at Estádio Universitário de Lisboa on 22 and 23 July.

Medalists

Results

Final
23 July
Wind: +1.7 m/s

Semifinals
23 July

Semifinal 1
Wind: +1.9 m/s

Semifinal 2
Wind: +1.9 m/s

Quarterfinals
22 July

Quarterfinal 1
Wind: +0.6 m/s

Quarterfinal 2
Wind: +1.4 m/s

Quarterfinal 3
Wind: +1.8 m/s

Quarterfinal 4
Wind: +0.9 m/s

Heats
22 July

Heat 1
Wind: +0.5 m/s

Heat 2
Wind: +0.5 m/s

Heat 3
Wind: 0.0 m/s

Heat 4
Wind: +1.3 m/s

Heat 5
Wind: +0.6 m/s

Heat 6
Wind: +1.2 m/s

Heat 7
Wind: +1.8 m/s

Participation
According to an unofficial count, 51 athletes from 38 countries participated in the event.

References

200 metres
200 metres at the World Athletics U20 Championships